Siekierki is a part of the Mokotów district of Warsaw.

Siekierki may also refer to:
Siekierki, Białystok County in Podlaskie Voivodeship (north-east Poland)
Siekierki, Siemiatycze County in Podlaskie Voivodeship (north-east Poland)
Siekierki, West Pomeranian Voivodeship (north-west Poland)